Devotion is the sixth studio album by American band, L.T.D., released in 1979 through A&M Records.

Reception
The album peaked at No. 5 on the R&B albums chart. It also reached No. 29 on the Billboard 200. The album features the singles "Dance 'N' Sing 'N'", which peaked at No. 15 on the Hot Soul Singles chart, and "Stranger", which charted at No. 14 on the same chart.

Track listing

Personnel 
Alvino M. Bennett – acoustic drums, electric drums
Lorenzo Carnegie – alto saxophone, tenor saxophone
Henry E. Davis – bass, flute
James E. Davis – acoustic piano, Yamaha electric piano, background vocals, clavinet
John McGhee – guitar
Abraham "Onion" Miller, Jr. – tenor saxophone
Jeffrey Osborne – percussion, lead vocals, background vocals
William M. Osborne – organ, lead vocals, background vocals, Fender Rhodes, percussion
Jake Riley – trombone
Carle W. Vickers – trumpet, flugelhorn, flute, percussion

Charts 
Album

Singles

References

External links 
 

1979 albums
L.T.D. (band) albums
Albums produced by Bobby Martin
Albums arranged by Bobby Martin
A&M Records albums